Drowning Creek is an unincorporated community and census-designated place (CDP) in Delaware County, Oklahoma, United States. The population was 155 at the 2010 census.

Geography
Drowning Creek is located northwest of the center of Delaware County, at the eastern end of an arm of the Grand Lake o' the Cherokees, in the valley of Drowning Creek.

Demographics

References

Census-designated places in Oklahoma
Census-designated places in Delaware County, Oklahoma